Geert Verheyen (born 10 March 1973) is a former Belgian professional road racing cyclist who competed as a professional between 1994 and 2011. He was born in Diest, and is the cousin of cyclist David Verheyen.

He turned professional in 1994, racing for Vlaanderen 2002-Eddy Merckx. In 1998 he went on to race for the UCI Professional Continental team, Lotto, and later Rabobank, Marlux, Chocolade Jacques and Colnago. He competed in the 1998 Tour de France and the 2006 Volta a Catalunya.

Major results

1993
 3rd Circuit de Wallonie
1994
 3rd Seraing-Aachen-Seraing
 5th Nationale Sluitingprijs
 7th Ronde van Limburg
1996
 6th Overall Tour of Austria
 7th Omloop van de Westhoek
 10th Grand Prix Cerami
 10th Omloop van het Waasland
1998
 1st Grand Prix de la Ville de Lillers
 5th Route Adélie
1999
 2nd Grand Prix d'Isbergues
 4th Overall Route du Sud
1st Stage 2
 5th Clásica de Almería
 7th Kampioenschap van Vlaanderen
 10th Overall Paris–Nice
 10th GP Ouest–France
2000
 6th Le Samyn
 10th Brabantse Pijl
2001
 1st Luk-Cup Bühl
 7th Brabantse Pijl
2002
 10th Coppa Sabatini
 10th Brabantse Pijl
2003
 2nd Schaal Sels
 4th Paris–Bourges
 5th Dwars door Vlaanderen
 6th Nationale Sluitingprijs
 10th Overall Circuit Franco-Belge
1st Stage 4
 10th GP Nobili Rubinetterie
2004
 3rd Road race, National Road Championships
 6th Grand Prix de Wallonie
2005
 1st Flèche Hesbignonne
2006
 4th Grand Prix Pino Cerami
2010
 2nd Rund um den Finanzplatz Eschborn–Frankfurt
 8th Grand Prix Pino Cerami

Grand Tour general classification results timeline

References

External links

Belgian male cyclists
1973 births
Living people
People from Diest
Cyclists from Flemish Brabant